Tony Briggs (born 3 July 1967) is an Aboriginal Australian actor, playwright, screenwriter, and producer. He also is a former track and field athlete. He is best known for creating the stage play The Sapphires (later a 2012 film), which tells the true story of an Aboriginal singing girl group who toured Vietnam during the war.

Early life
Tony Briggs was born on 3 July 1967. He is the son of Laurel Robinson, one of The Sapphires, and is a Yorta Yorta / Wurundjeri man.

He attended Scotch College, Melbourne as a boarding student from 1980 to 1985, and proved to be an outstanding athlete there. He was in the athletics team each year, and in 1985 was made Captain of Athletics.  he held the school record for the 400m, the 110m hurdles (under-15, under-17 and open), and the under-16 100m hurdles. Believed to be the first Indigenous Australian student at the school, Briggs was a School House Prefect in his final year.

Career

Television
Between 1987 and 1988, Briggs had the recurring role of banker Pete Baxter on television soap opera Neighbours. This was followed by many roles in television series such as Blue Heelers, Stingers and The Man From Snowy River. From 1997 he appeared in children's television series Ocean Girl as Dave Hartley.

From 2009, Briggs appeared in the television series The Circuit as Mick Mathers. In 2011, Briggs played Bilal in The Slap, based on the book by Christos Tsiolkas.

He also had a role in Redfern Now in 2012. In 2016, he played the role of Boondee in the television drama series Cleverman and Brett in Nowhere Boys: Two Moons Rising. In 2017 he had a role in Seven Types of Ambiguity and was involved in creating and writing the series The Warriors as well as appearing in a small role.

Theatre
Briggs wrote the Helpmann Award-winning play The Sapphires, first performed in 2004. It tells the story of The Sapphires, a singing group of four Koori women who tour Vietnam during the war.  It is inspired by the true story of his mother, Laurel Robinson, and aunt, Lois Peeler, who toured Vietnam as singers in 1968. Briggs adapted the play for the 2012 film The Sapphires.

Film
His movie roles include Australian Rules in 2002, Bran Nue Dae in 2009, Healing in 2014, and Joey in 1997.

Recognition and awards
Both the drama and film of The Sapphires won or were nominated for several awards, including winning the Helpmann Award in 2005 for best Australian New Work. Apart from these, Briggs was also the recipient of personal awards and recognition:
2012: Co-winner, Deadly Award – Jimmy Little Lifetime Achievement Award for Contribution to Aboriginal and Torres Strait Islander music, co-winner with the original Sapphires
2013: Awarded the Bob Maza Fellowship by Screen Australia to further his international career, which allowed him to attend an intensive course on directing and filmmaking in New York City
2013: NAIDOC Award – Artist of the Year

Athletics career
Briggs was a successful 400m hurdler, and was runner-up at the Australian Athletics Championships from 1990 to 1992. He also finished third at the 1990 Championships in the 110m hurdles.

He was an Australian Institute of Sport athletics scholarship holder from 1986 to 1987.

Other activities and roles
In 2016 Briggs became patron of his alma mater Scotch College's foundation to perpetually endow the Scotch College Indigenous Scholarship programme.

References

External links

 

Living people
1967 births
20th-century Australian male actors
21st-century Australian male actors
Australian male film actors
Australian male soap opera actors
Australian male stage actors
Helpmann Award winners
Indigenous Australian male actors